India participated in World Games 2009 in Kaohsiung, Taiwan with 6 athletes, but failed to win any medals.

Athletes

References

2009
2009 in Indian sport
Nations at the 2009 World Games